Golmud East railway station, or Geermu East railway station is a railway station in Golmud, Qinghai, China.

See also 
 List of stations on Qingzang railway

External links 
 Google Maps

Stations on the Qinghai–Tibet Railway
Railway stations in Qinghai